Anokhinka is a rural locality (a settlement) in Nizhnekamenskoye Rural Settlement, Talovsky District, Voronezh Oblast, Russia. The population was 167 as of 2010. There are 3 streets.

Geography 
It is located 17 km southeast of Talovaya.

References 

Rural localities in Talovsky District